Reedy Creek is a locality located within the Kingston District Council in the Limestone Coast region of South Australia. The Kingston-Naracoorte railway line opened through the area on 1 September 1876. The Reedy Creek township grew around the railway siding. The railway closed in 1987.

The 2016 Australian census which was conducted in August 2016 reports that Reedy Creek had a population of 95 people.

Reedy Creek is located within the federal division of Barker and the state  electoral district of Mackillop.

References

Limestone Coast